Prince of Wales Island is an Arctic island in Nunavut, Canada. One of the larger members of the Arctic Archipelago, it lies between Victoria Island and Somerset Island and is south of the Queen Elizabeth Islands.

For administrative purposes, it is divided between Qikiqtaaluk and Kitikmeot regions. There are no permanent settlements on the island.

Geography

It is a low tundra-covered island with an irregular coastline deeply indented by Ommanney Bay in the west and Browne Bay in the east. Ommanney Bay is named after Admiral Sir Erasmus Ommanney of the Royal Navy who explored the area as part of the search for the Franklin Expedition.

Prince of Wales Island is the world's 40th largest island and the 10th largest in Canada.

History

Its European discovery came in 1851 by Francis Leopold McClintock's sledge parties during the searches for John Franklin's last expedition. McClintock, along with Sherard Osborn and William Browne, charted the northern half of the island. Its southern half was charted by Allen Young in 1859. It was named after Albert Edward, eldest son of Queen Victoria, then ten years old and Prince of Wales. He later became King Edward VII.

See also
 Desert island
 List of islands

Further reading

 Blackadar, Robert Gordon; Precambrian Geology of Boothia Peninsula, Somerset Island, and Prince of Wales Island, District of Franklin, Ottawa, ON: Dept. of Energy, Mines and Resources, 1967
 Christie, Robert Loring; Stratigraphic Sections of Palaeozoic Rocks on Prince of Wales and Somerset Island, District of Franklin, Northwest Territories, Ottawa, ON: Queen's Printer, 1967
 Dyke, Arthur S.; Quaternary Geology of Prince of Wales Island, Arctic Canada, Ottawa, ON: Geological Survey of Canada, 1992, 
 Mayr, Ulrich; Geology of eastern Prince of Wales Island and adjacent smaller islands, Nunavut (parts of NTS 68D, Baring Channel and 68A, Fisher Lake), Ottawa, ON: Geological Survey of Canada, 2004,

References

External links 
 
 Prince of Wales Island in the Atlas of Canada - Toporama; Natural Resources Canada

Uninhabited islands of Kitikmeot Region
Uninhabited islands of Qikiqtaaluk Region